Lǐ Miǎo (李邈) (746 – June 11, 773) was a Tang dynasty prince and Tang Daizong's second son from the consort Cui.

It is not clear when he was born, but judging by his younger brother Li Jiong's date of birth it is speculated to be sometime between 746 and 750.

Although the consort Cui was Daizong's first wife, she lost Daizong's favor after her maternal clan was slaughtered during the Anshi Rebellion.

Li Miao was known to be a studious and virtuous person.

In 761 he was bestowed the title Prince of Yichang by his grandfather Tang Suzong.

In 762 he was bestowed the title Prince of Zheng by his father Daizong.

Li Miao died on June 11, 773.

Tang dynasty people
746 births
773 deaths